Ven House in Milborne Port, Somerset, England is an English manor house that has been designated as a Grade I listed building.

Construction of the smaller William and Mary style house, was completed in 1698–1700; the house was enlarged around 1725–30 for James Medlycott by Nathaniel Ireson, who retained the west front of the earlier house.  It stands on an artificially raised terrace, and is surrounded by grounds that were laid out at the time by Richard Grange. It was altered and extended by Thomas Cubitt and Decimus Burton in 1835–36.

The house passed through the Medlycot family through the 18th and 19th centuries, until they sold much of the estate between 1918 and 1925. The house itself was let to a succession of tenants until Sir Hubert Mervyn Medlycot sold it in 1957. The house has changed hands four times since 1993, and, in 2006, had a guide price of £8.5m. In 2013 the house was sold to Charles Lamb Allen, Baron Allen of Kensington.

Architecture

The house, which has a rectangular plan of 7 bays by 5 bays, is built of red brick in Flemish bond, with local Ham stone dressings. The north and south fronts are divided by two giant Corinthian pilasters, placed to suggest a central block of three bays. The roof is hipped with Welsh slate behind balustraded parapets. Attached to the house and in matching style were north west and north east pavilions. Along the south side of the house is a terrace balustraded to match the house.

The 1836 building work by Decimus Burton, which provided a new drawing-room for Sir W. Medleycott included the construction of the corridor linking Ven House and the Orangery, and the Orangery itself. Also constructed around 1836 were the Stabling and several other outbuildings, which are attached to east side of the house.

Gardens and park

They were originally laid out by Richard Grange between 1720 and 1739. The house still has almost  of gardens and grounds, including a stream which forms part of the River Yeo.

To the south east of the house is Walled garden which was a kitchen garden or plant nursery, but is now largely ornamental.

The remnants of the early 18th-century formal gardens and formal park landscape have been designated Grade II in the South Somerset Register of Historic Parks and Gardens and Register of Historic Parks and Gardens of special historic interest in England.

See also

 List of Grade I listed buildings in South Somerset

Notes

References

Houses completed in 1700
Grade I listed buildings in South Somerset
Grade I listed houses in Somerset
Grade II listed parks and gardens in Somerset
Gardens in Somerset
1700 establishments in England
Hamstone buildings